Valley Shepherd Creamery is an artisan cheese making farm in Long Valley, New Jersey, and the winner of Edible Communities' New Jersey Food Artisan award in 2009.

History
The milk comes from sheep raised on the farm and some cheeses are made with a mix of sheep's milk and local cow's milk. An on site shop sells the cheeses, and there are tours of the spring lamb births, as well as the milking and cheese making areas.

See also

 List of cheesemakers

References

External links

Farms in New Jersey
Food and drink companies established in 2005
Cheesemakers
Companies based in Morris County, New Jersey
Dairy products companies of the United States
American companies established in 2005